Chlamydastis prudentula is a moth of the family Depressariidae. It is found in Peru.

The wingspan is about 14 mm. The forewings are white, speckled grey and dark grey with a slightly curved shade of dark grey irroration from the costa at one-third to the dorsum at two-fifths, and another somewhat sinuate from the costa at five-sixths to the dorsum before the tornus. The plical and second discal stigmata are black, with a median band of grey suffusion passing between these but not reaching the dorsum. There is a streak of grey-brownish suffusion just before the termen on the upper two-thirds. There is a terminal series of black dots. The hindwings are light grey.

References

Moths described in 1926
Chlamydastis